Hugo Eduardo Herrera Arellano (born 5 February 1974) is a Chilean lawyer, philosopher and scholar dedicated to the Philosophy of Right. Known as the theoretician of the Chilean "social right-wing", Herrera works as a professor at the Schools of Law of the Diego Portales University (UDP) and the University of Valparaíso (UV).

A former member of the Independent Democratic Union (UDI) from 1993 to 1997, Herrera is identified with centre-right politics, but proclaims to being distant from the neoliberal ideas of Milton Friedman and the Chicago Boys. He has been described as "one of the most lucid and enlightened intellectuals from the Chilean right today". He has also been classified by the libertarian Axel Kaiser as being close in thought to Chilean nationalism, but Herrera prefers to pigeonhole himself into a "national-popular tradition", and within which he mainly rescues works of Alberto Edwards or historians like Francisco Antonio Encina and Mario Góngora.

In 2015 he was an independent member of the Political Committee of Chile Vamos, a centre-right coalition whose then leader was Sebastián Piñera. Nevertheless, he has criticized his own coalition for its "lack of political vision" related, according him, to the prevalence of economic discourse over any other. One of the politicians whom he has influenced in the coalition is Mario Desbordes of Renovación Nacional (RN), although Desbordes does not recognize himself as being grounded in Herrera's theory. This influence became notorious after the Estallido Social (Social Outbreak; 2019–20 protests), where Desbordes was a key politician in the November 15th agreement to "Approve" a new constitution in the plebiscite to replace the 1980 constitution.

Herrera is a member of the board of several scientific journals, including the University of Valparaíso Journal of Social Sciences. He is a regular columnist in various Chilean press media, specifically the newspapers La Tercera, La Segunda, El Mercurio, and El Mostrador.

Biography

Early life
Born in Vina del Mar, he attended Sagrados Corazones School during his primary education and the high school. Once graduated, he decided to study laws at University of Valparaíso (UV), joining to that institution in 1992. He obtained his Bachelor of Arts in May 1998 after approving his thesis entitled «Fin, virtudes y ley en la 'Suma contra Gentiles». It was supervised by the scholar Joaquín García-Huidobro Correa. Then, in 2004, he obtained his PhD at the University of Würzburg.

During his spell at the university, he was secretary general of the UV Students Federation (FEUV) from 1994 to 1995. There, he was a member UDI Youth until 1998, year which he distanced from them due to his growing "ideological distance from the party and its neoliberal discourse".

Scholar career
In 2005, when he ended his term in Würzburg, his doctoral thesis titled  was released.

Works

Books
 Cinco ensayos sobre la fundamentación de la praxis, Valparaíso. Valparaíso, Chile, University of Valparaíso Editions (2000)
 Sein und Staat. Die ontologische Begründung der politischen Praxis bei Helmut Kuhn. Würzburg, Germany, Königshausen & Neumann (2005)
 ¿De qué hablamos cuando hablamos de Estado? Ensayo filosófico de justificación de la praxis política. Santiago, Chile, Instituto de Estudios de la Sociedad (2009)
 Carl Schmitt als politischer Philosoph. Versuch einer Bestimmung seiner Stellung bezüglich der Tradition der praktischen Philosophie. Berlín, Germany, Duncker & Humblot (2010)
 Más allá del cientificismo. Santiago, Chile, Diego Portales University Editions (2011)
 La excepción universitaria. Reflexiones sobre la educación superior chilena. Santiago, Chile, Diego Portales University Editions (2012)
 La derecha en la crisis del bicentenario. Santiago, Chile, Diego Portales University Editions (2015)
 La frágil universidad. Santiago, Chile, Centro de Estudios Públicos (2016)
 Octubre en Chile. Santiago, Chile, Katankura (2019)
 Carl Schmitt Between Technological Rationality and Theology: The Position and Meaning of His Legal Thought. New York, US, State University of New York Press (2020)
 Razón bruta revolucionaria. Santiago, Chile, Katankura (2020)

References

External links
 Profile at Diego Portales University School of Law
 Profile at CIPER Chile

1974 births
21st-century Chilean lawyers
Living people
People from Viña del Mar
Chilean philosophers
University of Valparaíso alumni
Academic staff of the University of Valparaíso
University of Würzburg alumni
Independent Democratic Union politicians
Carl Schmitt scholars